When a Stranger Calls is a 2006 American psychological horror thriller film directed by Simon West and written by Jake Wade Wall. The film stars Camilla Belle, Brian Geraghty, Katie Cassidy, Tessa Thompson and Clark Gregg. Belle plays a babysitter who starts to receive threatening phone calls from an unidentified stranger, played by both Tommy Flanagan and Lance Henriksen. It is a remake of Fred Walton's 1979 horror film of the same name, which became a cult classic for its opening 20 minutes, which this remake extends to a feature-length film.

The film was theatrically released on February 3, 2006. It was panned by critics but was a moderate box office success, grossing $67 million worldwide on a $15 million budget.

Plot
A local sheriff enters a home where multiple homicides have been committed; the victims are three children and their babysitter, all slaughtered brutally by an intruder using his bare hands.

In Colorado, 125 miles away from the crime scene, sixteen-year-old Jill Johnson (Camilla Belle) is on her way to babysit for the wealthy Mandrakis family, as punishment for exceeding her cell phone minutes. When she arrives, Mrs Mandrakis shows her around and tells her about their live-in housemaid, Rosa.

A long time after the parents leave, Jill begins to receive obscene phone calls from someone (voiced by Lance Henriksen) who, most of the time, does not say anything and then hangs up. She initially believes it is her friends playing a prank but when she contacts them, they deny it. While the Mandrakis' two children are asleep upstairs, Jill is visited by her friend Tiffany (Katie Cassidy) but, in fear of getting into further trouble, Jill asks her to leave. While returning to her car, Tiffany is ambushed by an unseen intruder.

Jill receives a call from the person, indicating he can see her. Alarmed, she calls the police, who tell her they can trace the calls if she is able to keep him on the line for at least sixty seconds. While waiting for the phone to ring, Jill sees a shadow moving in the guest house. Believing it is the Mandrakis' son back from college, she goes to investigate, but finds the guest house empty. While in the guest house, the phone rings and it's the same caller. This only confirms her fear that he's watching her. She keeps him on the phone so the call can be traced, only to remember he called the wrong line. Jill looks out the window and sees Rosa's vehicles light come on.

Believing Rosa is home, Jill searches for her, but finds no one is there. The phone rings again, and the caller remains quiet on the other end, and Jill manages to keep him on the line for a minute so the call can be traced. Jill then hears the shower running in the maid's room but, upon checking, the bathroom is empty. The police then tell her the calls are coming from inside the house. Horrified, Jill finds Tiffany’s body on the bathroom floor and flees.

Jill goes to the children who are already hiding in their playroom. She looks up and sees the intruder (Tommy Flanagan) in the loft. They all escape into the greenhouse and hide; Jill discovers Rosa's dead body under the water. The intruder enters and searches the greenhouse. Jill manages to lock him inside but he breaks out and attacks her. During the altercation, Jill manages to stab the assailant's hand into the hardwood floor with a fireplace poker, before rushing out of the house into the arms of a police officer. The assailant is arrested.

Days later while recovering in the hospital, Jill awakens to a phone ringing. She gets out of bed and, while looking at her reflection in the mirror, the assailant appears behind her and grabs her. She begins to shriek hysterically, waking from her hallucination as the doctors and her father desperately try to stop her frantic panicking.

Cast
 Camilla Belle as Jill Johnson
 Tommy Flanagan as The Stranger
 Lance Henriksen as The Stranger (voice)
 Katie Cassidy as Tiffany Madison
 Tessa Thompson as Scarlett
 Brian Geraghty as Bobby
 Clark Gregg as Ben Johnson
 Derek de Lint as Dr. Mandrakis
 Kate Jennings Grant as Kelly Mandrakis
 David Denman as Officer Burroughs
 Arthur Young as Will Mandrakis
 Madeline Carroll as Allison Mandrakis
 Steve Eastin as Detective Harv Hines
 John Bobek as Officer Lewis
 Brad Surosky as "Boom-Boom"
 Karina Logue as Track Coach
 Rosine Ace Hatem as Rosa Ramirez
 Escher Holloway as Cody
 Owen Smith as Police Officer
 Jessica Faye Helmer as Additional Police Officer
 Lillie West as Stacy (voice)
 Dianna Agron as Cheerleader

Production
Screen Gems first announced production of When a Stranger Calls in August 2004, with Jake Wade Wall penning the script. Screen Gems had plans to release both a remake of the original film and a sequel titled When a Stranger Returns.

Casting
Evan Rachel Wood was offered the role of Jill, but turned it down. Camilla Belle was then approached and almost turned the role down due to her personal dislike for horror films but West, the director, convinced her that he was going more for a psychological thriller and so she accepted. To prepare for the role, Belle had to do two months of weight-training and learning how to run. Belle was injured twice on the set; she struck a wooden bridge, cutting and scarring her hand, and also slammed her head against a glass window.

Filming
Principal photography occurred from January 1 to February 28, 2005, in Vancouver, Canada. Bellarmine-Jefferson High School was used to portray the high school seen in the film while Signal Hill was used to portray the carnival shown in the film. Running Springs was used as the filming location for the road sequences. The house that was used in the film is located at Culver Studios in Culver City, California.

Music

Score

When a Stranger Calls: The Complete Original Motion Picture Score, 15-instrumental songs composed by James Dooley, was released on February 10, 2006.

Distribution
For the release of the film, AOL Instant Messenger ran ads beckoning users to IM Jill020306. When messaged, "Jill" (a Colloquis-style program) made small talk before panicking, as she received calls from a stranger asking her to check the children. She then gives the user her phone number (a toll-free 877 number) and asks them to call her. When users call, they hear an ad for the movie.
Also, around the time of the DVD release, a new screen name appeared, Jill051606, to tie in with the DVD release date on May 16, 2006. It does not involve calling her, but instead she directs users to a video security system on the official DVD site where the shadow of the stranger passes by frequently.

As a marketing promotion for the film, a MySpace profile was created for Jill051606 featuring photos from the film. Users could add the profile as a friend, leave comments, and read Jill's blog.

Home media
The film was released on DVD and UMD on May 16, 2006. Special features include two audio commentaries (one with Camilla Belle and Simon West; the other with Jake Wade Wall), deleted scenes, a 20-minute making-of featurette, and trailers. A Blu-ray version of the film was released for the first time by Mill Creek Entertainment on October 4, 2016 in a triple feature with I Know What You Did Last Summer (1997) and Vacancy (2007). This disc contains none of the extras found on the DVD. This initial release was discontinued, and a new version was released by Mill Creek titled "Queens of Scream - Triple Feature" on February 5, 2019. The new release is virtually identical, with the only differences being a new cover on the case and the inclusion of a DVD copy alongside the Blu-ray.

Reception

Box office
The film opened at number one with $21.6 million. It then made $9.1 million in its second weekend and $5 million in its third. The film went on to gross a total of $47.9 million domestically, and $19.2 million internationally for a total worldwide gross of $67.1 million.

Critical reception
When A Stranger Calls was critically panned. On the review aggregator Rotten Tomatoes, the film holds an approval rating of 9% based on 93 reviews and an average rating of 3.5/10. The website's critics consensus reads: "When a Stranger Calls ranks among the more misguided remakes in horror history, offering little more than a rote, largely fright-free update to the original."  On Metacritic, it has a weighted average score of 27 out of 100, based on 20 critics, indicating "generally unfavorable reviews." Audiences polled by CinemaScore gave the film an average grade of "B−" on an A+ to F scale.

Accolades
In 2006, When a Stranger Calls was nominated to the Golden Trailer Awards in the category "Best Thriller".

Possible sequel
Screen Gems was initially planning to make a sequel rumored to be titled When a Stranger Returns with Hayden Panettiere set to star as the babysitter, in light of the film's box office success. This sequel never materialized.

Writer Jake Wade Wall discussed the possibility of a sequel in September 2020. His treatment would have the film be a remake of the second half of the original film, where Jill Johnson is older now and has a family and the killer has escaped the asylum, citing the success of Halloween (2018) as an inspiration.

See also
 List of films featuring home invasions
 The Babysitter and the Man Upstairs
 When a Killer Calls (2006), a mockbuster of this film released by The Asylum.

References

External links
 
 
 
 
 

When a Stranger Calls (film series)
2006 films
2006 horror films
2006 psychological thriller films
2000s horror thriller films
2000s psychological horror films
2000s serial killer films
2000s teen horror films
Remakes of American films
American horror thriller films
American psychological horror films
American psychological thriller films
American serial killer films
American teen horror films
Davis Entertainment films
Films about stalking
Films based on urban legends
Films directed by Simon West
Films produced by John Davis
Films produced by Wyck Godfrey
Films scored by James Dooley
Home invasions in film
Horror film remakes
Teen thriller films
Films about telephony
Thriller film remakes
2000s English-language films
2000s American films